Cebrail Karayel (born 15 August 1994) is a Turkish footballer who plays as a right back for Konyaspor.

Career
In January 2019, Karayel signed his first professional contract with MKE Ankaragücü, keeping him at the club for 2.5 years. Karayel made his professional debut with Ankaragücü in a 2-2 Süper Lig tie with Çaykur Rizespor on 4 May 2019.

On 1 June 2022, Karayel signed a two-year contract with Konyaspor.

References

External links
 
 
 
 Yeni Safak Profile

1994 births
People from Sungurlu
Living people
Turkish footballers
Association football fullbacks
Ankaraspor footballers
Şanlıurfaspor footballers
MKE Ankaragücü footballers
Altay S.K. footballers
Konyaspor footballers
Süper Lig players
TFF First League players
TFF Second League players
TFF Third League players